The International Printing and Graphic Communications Union (IPGCU) was a labor union representing printing workers in the United States and Canada.

The union was established on 1 October 1973, when the International Printing Pressmen and Assistants' Union of North America merged with the International Stereotypers' and Electrotypers' Union. Like both its predecessors, it affiliated to the AFL–CIO.

On formation, the union had 105,000 members, but this figure steadily fell, and by 1981, membership was down to 93,000. On 25 May 1983, the union merged with the Graphic Arts International Union, to form the Graphic Communications International Union.

Presidents
1973: Alexander Rohan
1974: Sol Fishko

References

Trade unions established in 1973
Trade unions disestablished in 1983
Printing trade unions